Ingadóttir is an Icelandic matronymic. Notable people with the name include:

Álfheiður Ingadóttir (born 1951), Icelandic politician
Sigríður Ingibjörg Ingadóttir (born 1968), Icelandic economist and politician

Icelandic-language surnames